Giacomo Inaudi (13 October 1867 – 10 November 1950), also known as Jacques Inaudi in France, was an Italian calculating prodigy.

He was born in Roccabruna, Piedmont, Italy. As a child he was a shepherd but showed aptitude for mental calculation. Inaudi's abilities attracted the interest of showmen and he toured around the world.

French scientists like Jean-Martin Charcot investigated his abilities, French astronomer Camille Flammarion praised him in strong terms, and Alfred Binet wrote a book on him. Inaudi would repeat the numbers he was given before he began his mental calculations.

Inaudi was referred to by the Nobel-prize-winning immunologist, Élie Metchnikoff (Ilya Ilyich Mechnikov), in his book The Nature of Man: Studies in Optimistic Philosophy (1905). Metchnikoff regarded Inaudi as an example of a mutation, in the sense announced by the Dutch botanist Hugo de Vries (Die Mutationstheorie, Vol. 1, Leipzig, 1901), i.e., a sudden leap to a distinct new type that might be regarded as a new species. Metchnikoff argued that this kind of abrupt leap in evolution might explain how humans had emerged from apes and that Inaudi was proof that such a mutation was possible.

See also
 Serge Nicolas & Alessandro Guida, Charcot and the Mental Calculator Jacques Inaudi, in The European Yearbook of the History of Psychology 1 (2015), p. 107-138

References

External links

Flammarion article on Inaudi

1867 births
1950 deaths
People from the Province of Cuneo
Mental calculators
19th-century Italian mathematicians
20th-century Italian mathematicians
Shepherds